Invermere was a river boat that operated in British Columbia on the Columbia River from 1912 to about 1915.  It was named for the town of Invermere.

Design and Construction
Invermere was built at Golden, British Columbia, in 1912 by riverboat captain Alexander Blakely  Although built in the style of a steamboat, Invermere was powered by a gasoline or diesel engine, then a newer method of marine propulsion.  In 1914, Invermere was licensed to carry 20 passengers.

Operations

Invermere's owner, Alexander Blakely, was a steamboat captain who operated on the upper Columbia route from Golden to Windermere Lake.

DismantledInvermere'' was removed from the official registry in 1915.  Other boats on the river were taken out of service at the same time, as riverboat operations were coming to an end.

Notes

Riverboats
Columbia Valley
1912 ships